Natalia Jean Kuipers (born June 13, 2002) is a swimmer for the U.S. Virgin Islands. She competed in the women's 400 meter freestyle at 2020 Summer Olympics. She also competed at the 2018 Summer Youth Olympics in the girls' 200 meter and 400 meter freestyle events.

References

External links
 
 Bryant Bulldogs bio

Living people
2002 births
United States Virgin Islands female swimmers
Olympic swimmers of the United States Virgin Islands
Swimmers at the 2020 Summer Olympics
Bryant Bulldogs athletes
College women's swimmers in the United States
People from Saint Croix, U.S. Virgin Islands